Spirit of Manila Airlines Corporation, operated as Spirit of Manila Airlines, was a low-cost airline based in Roxas Sea Front Garden in Pasay, Philippines. Its main hub was Clark International Airport. The airline's tagline/slogan was: "I am going home".

History
After the airline was established in 2008, operations between Clark International Airport and Taipei began in October 2011 with two flights each week. The airline soon developed a poor reputation as low passenger numbers led to it delaying or cancelling flights. The airline ceased operations in 2012 after only three months of flights.

In 2016, its Airline Operator Certificate, a license to operate an airline under Philippine laws was resurrected under a different brand name Pan Pacific Airlines.

Destinations
Spirit of Manila Airlines served the following destinations:
Philippines
Angeles City - Clark International Airport Main Hub
Republic of China (Taiwan)
Taipei - Taiwan Taoyuan International Airport

Fleet

The Spirit of Manila Airlines fleet consisted of the following aircraft:

References

External links

Official site 

Defunct airlines of the Philippines
Airlines established in 2008
Airlines disestablished in 2012
Defunct low-cost airlines
Companies based in Pasay
Philippine companies established in 2008